Indian River Shores is a resort town on Orchid Island, in Indian River County, Florida, United States. Surrounded by water, the town is bordered by the Indian River to the west and the Atlantic Ocean to the east. The population was 3,901 at the 2010 census, up from 3,448 at the 2000 census. It was ranked ninth in Florida locations by per capita income as of 2010. The town's wealth has given it the reputation of a exclusive tourist town.

Indian River Shores is part of the Sebastian–Vero Beach Metropolitan Statistical Area.

Geography

Indian River Shores is located in eastern Indian River County at  (27.707366, –80.382233). It is bordered to the north by Wabasso Beach; to the south by Vero Beach; to the west, across the Indian River, by Winter Beach and Gifford; and to the east by the Atlantic Ocean.

Demographics

As of the census of 2000, there were 3,448 people, 1,854 households, and 1,334 families residing in the town. The racial makeup of the town was 98.72% White, 0.12% African American, 0.06% Native American, 0.67% Asian, and 0.44% from two or more races. Hispanic or Latino of any race were 0.84% of the population.

There were 1,854 households, out of which 4.6% had children under the age of 18 living with them, 70.1% were married couples living together, 1.3% had a female householder with no husband present, and 28.0% were non-families. 26.8% of all households were made up of individuals, and 20.4% had someone living alone who was 65 years of age or older. The average household size was 1.86 and the average family size was 2.17.

In the town, the population was spread out, with 4.9% under the age of 18, 1.0% from 18 to 24, 4.3% from 25 to 44, 26.9% from 45 to 64, and 62.9% who were 65 years of age or older. The median age was 69 years. For every 100 females, there were 85.5 males. For every 100 females age 18 and over, there were 85.1 males.

The median income for a household in the town was $110,729, and the median income for a family was $141,952. Males had a median income of $100,000 versus $40,179 for females. The per capita income for the town was $102,511. About 1.5% of families and 2.2% of the population were below the poverty line, including none of those under age 18 and 2.9% of those age 65 or over.

References

External links
 Town of Indian River Shores official website

Towns in Indian River County, Florida
Beaches of Florida
Towns in Florida
Populated coastal places in Florida on the Atlantic Ocean
Beaches of Indian River County, Florida
1953 establishments in Florida
Populated places established in 1953